Babayaro is a surname. Notable people with the surname include:

Celestine Babayaro (born 1978), Nigerian footballer
Emmanuel Babayaro (born 1976), Nigerian footballer
 

Surnames of Nigerian origin